Vekovka is a rural locality (a settlement) in Grigoryevskoye Rural Settlement, Gus-Khrustalny District, Vladimir Oblast, Russia. The population was 895 as of 2010.

Geography 
Vekovka is located 34 km southeast of Gus-Khrustalny (the district's administrative centre) by road. Stepanovo is the nearest rural locality.

References 

Rural localities in Gus-Khrustalny District